Phoenix is the fifth studio album by American indie rock band Pedro the Lion. It was released on January 18, 2019 through Polyvinyl Record Co.

It is the first album in fifteen years for the band, with their last album Achilles Heel being released in 2004.

Track listing

Charts

References

2019 albums
Pedro the Lion albums
Polyvinyl Record Co. albums